Mario Abbate (Naples, 8 August 1927 – Naples, 6 August 1981) was an Italian singer and actor, famous as an exponent of Neapolitan songs. He appeared in three Italian movies: Naples Sings (1953), It Happened at the Police Station (1954), and Treasure of San Gennaro (1966). He died on 6 August 1981, two days before his 54th birthday.

External links

1927 births
1981 deaths
Italian male film actors
20th-century Italian male actors
20th-century Italian male singers
Musicians from Naples